The International Astronomical Union (IAU; , UAI) is a nongovernmental organisation with the objective of advancing astronomy in all aspects, including promoting astronomical research, outreach, education, and development through global cooperation. It was founded in 1919 and is based in Paris, France.

The IAU is composed of individual members, who include both professional astronomers and junior scientists, and national members, such as professional associations, national societies, or academic institutions. Individual members are organised into divisions, committees, and working groups centered on particular subdisciplines, subjects, or initiatives. As of 2018, the Union had over 13,700 individual members, spanning 90 countries, and 82 national members.

Among the key activities of the IAU is serving as a forum for scientific conferences. It sponsors nine annual symposia and holds a triannual General Assembly that sets policy and includes various scientific meetings. The Union is best known for being the leading authority in assigning official names and designations to astronomical objects, and for setting uniform definitions for astronomical principles. It also coordinates with national and international partners, such as UNESCO, to fulfill its mission.

The IAU is a member of the International Science Council (ISC), which is composed of international scholarly and scientific institutions and national academies of sciences.

Function
The International Astronomical Union is an international association of professional astronomers, at the PhD level and beyond, active in professional research and education in astronomy. Among other activities, it acts as the recognized authority for assigning designations and names to celestial bodies (stars, planets, asteroids, etc.) and any surface features on them.

The IAU is a member of the International Science Council (ISC). Its main objective is to promote and safeguard the science of astronomy in all its aspects through international cooperation. The IAU maintains friendly relations with organizations that include amateur astronomers in their membership. The IAU has its head office on the second floor of the Institut d'Astrophysique de Paris in the 14th arrondissement of Paris.

This organisation has many working groups. For example, the Working Group for Planetary System Nomenclature (WGPSN), which maintains the astronomical naming conventions and planetary nomenclature for planetary bodies, and the Working Group on Star Names (WGSN), which catalogues and standardizes proper names for stars. The IAU is also responsible for the system of astronomical telegrams which are produced and distributed on its behalf by the Central Bureau for Astronomical Telegrams. The Minor Planet Center also operates under the IAU, and is a "clearinghouse" for all non-planetary or non-moon bodies in the Solar System.

History 
The IAU was founded on 28 July 1919, at the Constitutive Assembly of the International Research Council (now the International Science Council) held in Brussels, Belgium. Two subsidiaries of the IAU were also created at this assembly: the International Time Commission seated at the International Time Bureau in Paris, France, and the International Central Bureau of Astronomical Telegrams initially seated in Copenhagen, Denmark.

The seven initial member states were Belgium, Canada, France, Great Britain, Greece, Japan, and the United States, soon to be followed by Italy and Mexico. The first executive committee consisted of Benjamin Baillaud (President, France), Alfred Fowler (General Secretary, UK), and four vice presidents: William Campbell (USA), Frank Dyson (UK), Georges Lecointe (Belgium), and Annibale Riccò (Italy). Thirty-two Commissions (referred to initially as Standing Committees) were appointed at the Brussels meeting and focused on topics ranging from relativity to minor planets. The reports of these 32 Commissions formed the main substance of the first General Assembly, which took place in Rome, Italy, 2–10 May 1922.

By the end of the first General Assembly, ten additional nations (Australia, Brazil, Czechoslovakia, Denmark, the Netherlands, Norway, Poland, Romania, South Africa, and Spain) had joined the Union, bringing the total membership to 19 countries. Although the Union was officially formed eight months after the end of World War I, international collaboration in astronomy had been strong in the pre-war era (e.g., the Astronomische Gesellschaft Katalog projects since 1868, the Astrographic Catalogue since 1887, and the International Union for Solar research since 1904).

The first 50 years of the Union's history are well documented. Subsequent history is recorded in the form of reminiscences of past IAU Presidents and General Secretaries. Twelve of the fourteen past General Secretaries in the period 1964–2006 contributed their recollections of the Union's history in IAU Information Bulletin No. 100. Six past IAU Presidents in the period 1976–2003 also contributed their recollections in IAU Information Bulletin No. 104.

In 2015 and 2019, the Union held the NameExoWorlds contests.

Composition 

As of 1 August 2019, the IAU has a total of 13,701 individual members, who are professional astronomers from 102 countries worldwide; 81.7% of individual members are male, while 18.3% are female.

Membership also includes 82 national members, professional astronomical communities representing their country's affiliation with the IAU. National members include the Australian Academy of Science, the Chinese Astronomical Society, the French Academy of Sciences, the Indian National Science Academy, the National Academies (United States), the National Research Foundation of South Africa, the National Scientific and Technical Research Council (Argentina), KACST (Saudi Arabia), the Council of German Observatories, the Royal Astronomical Society (United Kingdom), the Royal Astronomical Society of New Zealand, the Royal Swedish Academy of Sciences, the Russian Academy of Sciences, and the Science Council of Japan, among many others.

The sovereign body of the IAU is its General Assembly, which comprises all members. The Assembly determines IAU policy, approves the Statutes and By-Laws of the Union (and amendments proposed thereto) and elects various committees.

The right to vote on matters brought before the Assembly varies according to the type of business under discussion. The Statutes consider such business to be divided into two categories:
 issues of a "primarily scientific nature" (as determined by the Executive Committee), upon which voting is restricted to individual members, and
 all other matters (such as Statute revision and procedural questions), upon which voting is restricted to the representatives of national members.

On budget matters (which fall into the second category), votes are weighted according to the relative subscription levels of the national members. A second category vote requires a turnout of at least two-thirds of national members to be valid. An absolute majority is sufficient for approval in any vote, except for Statute revision which requires a two-thirds majority. An equality of votes is resolved by the vote of the President of the Union.

List of national members

Africa 
 Algeria
 Egypt
 Ethiopia
 Ghana
 Madagascar (observer)
 Morocco (observer)
 Mozambique (suspended)
 Nigeria
 South Africa

Asia 
 Armenia
 China
 Cyprus
 Georgia (suspended)
 India
 Indonesia
 Iran (suspended)
 Israel
 Japan
 Jordan
 Kazakhstan
 Lebanon (interim)
 Malaysia
 Mongolia (interim)
 North Korea (interim)
 Philippines
 Palestine
 Saudi Arabia (suspended)
 South Korea
 Syria (observer)
 Taiwan
 Tajikistan
 Thailand
 Turkey
 United Arab Emirates
 Vietnam (interim)

Europe 
 Austria
 Belgium
 Bulgaria
 Denmark
 Croatia
 Czech Republic
 Estonia
 Finland
 France
 Germany
 Greece
 Hungary
 Iceland
 Ireland
 Italy
 Latvia
 Lithuania
 Netherlands
 Norway
 Poland
 Portugal
 Romania
 Russia
 Serbia
 Slovakia
 Slovenia
 Spain
 Sweden
 Switzerland
 Ukraine
 United Kingdom
 Vatican City

North America 
 Canada
 Costa Rica (interim)
 Honduras (interim)
 Mexico
 Panama (interim)
 United States

Oceania 
 Australia
 New Zealand

South America 
 Argentina
 Bolivia (suspended)
 Brazil
 Chile
 Colombia
 Peru (suspended)
 Uruguay (observer)
 Venezuela

Terminated national members 
 Azerbaijan
 Cuba
 North Macedonia
 Uzbekistan

General Assemblies 
Since 1922, the IAU General Assembly meets every three years, except for the period between 1938 and 1948, due to World War II.
After a Polish request in 1967, and by a controversial decision of the then President of the IAU, an Extraordinary IAU General Assembly was held in September 1973 in Warsaw, Poland, to commemorate the 500th anniversary of the birth of Nicolaus Copernicus, soon after the regular 1973 GA had been held in Sydney.

List of the presidents of the IAU
Sources.

Commission 46: Education in astronomy 
Commission 46 is a Committee of the Executive Committee of the IAU, playing a special role in the discussion of astronomy development with governments and scientific academies. The IAU is affiliated with the International Council of Scientific Unions (ICSU), a non-governmental organization representing a global membership that includes both national scientific bodies and international scientific unions. They often encourage countries to become members of the IAU. The Commission further seeks to development, information or improvement of astronomical education. Part of Commission 46, is Teaching Astronomy for Development (TAD) program in countries where there is currently very little astronomical education. Another program is named the Galileo Teacher Training Program (GTTP), is a project of the International Year of Astronomy 2009, among which Hands-On Universe that will concentrate more resources on education activities for children and schools designed to advance sustainable global development. GTTP is also concerned with the effective use and transfer of astronomy education tools and resources into classroom science curricula. A strategic plan for the period 2010–2020 has been published.

Publications 

In 2004 the IAU contracted with the Cambridge University Press to publish the Proceedings of the International Astronomical Union.

In 2007, the Communicating Astronomy with the Public Journal Working Group prepared a study assessing the feasibility of the Communicating Astronomy with the Public Journal (CAP Journal).

See also 
 Astronomical acronyms
 Astronomical naming conventions
 List of proper names of stars
 Planetary nomenclature

References 
 

 Statutes of the IAU, VII General Assembly (1948), pp. 13–15

External links 

 
 XXVIth General Assembly 2006
 XXVIIth General Assembly 2009
 XXVIIIth General Assembly 2012 
 XXIXth General Assembly 2015
 XXXth General Assembly 2018

Astronomy organizations
International organizations based in France
International professional associations
Members of the International Council for Science
Organizations based in Paris
Scientific organizations based in France
Scientific organizations established in 1919
1919 establishments in France
Standards organizations in France
International scientific organizations
International scientific organizations based in Europe
Members of the International Science Council